Alfredo Hernández is an American drummer best known as a former member of desert rock bands Kyuss, Queens of the Stone Age, Brant Bjork and the Bros and Yawning Man, and as a current member of the band, Avon.

Career 

Hernández joined Kyuss in  1994, replacing previous drummer Brant Bjork who had left the band due to personal reasons. Kyuss' Josh Homme stated at the time that Hernández was the only drummer considered for the job. He appeared on the band's final studio album ...And the Circus Leaves Town. Kyuss soon went on indefinite hiatus in October 1995. Hernandez subsequently drummed on Queens of the Stone Age's self-titled debut record released in 1998. In 2004 he recorded an EP, and briefly toured, with former Queens of the Stone Age bassist Nick Oliveri's band, Mondo Generator.

Hernández was a founding member of the band Yawning Man, and later teamed up with fellow ex-Kyuss drummer Brant Bjork and Dave Dinsmore to form Ché. The 2000 album Sounds of Liberation was the only material which the band recorded and, after a small tour of live shows, the band disbanded, with Hernández joining Orquesta del Desierto. Later he joined Brant Bjork & The Bros on their album Somera Sól and toured with them in 2007.

Hernández played in Vic Du Monte's Persona Non Grata with Chris Cockrell and James Childs until 2011, recording three albums, two EPs and completing 10 tours since 2005.

He currently plays in the desert hardcore band "Family Butcher"
Hernández is also involved in a project with Mike Neider (Bl'ast/LAB) and Dave Dinsmore (Bl'ast/LAB/Unida/Che) called "Gusto".

Fellow Desert Rock drummer Brant Bjork described his relationship with Alfredo:

Equipment 

Ludwig Drums

14" Steel Snare Drum
14" tom-tom
18" Floor Tom
28" Bass Drum

Zildjian Cymbals

14" A Mastersound Hi-Hats
18" A Medium Crash
19" A Custom Projection Crash
22" A Custom Medium Ride

Zildjian Drumsticks, currently a 5B, with Kyuss he used the Zildjian Rock Stick

Discography 
 ...And the Circus Leaves Town - Kyuss, 1995
 Planet Mamon - The Sort Of Quartet, 1995
 Bombas De Amor - The Sort Of Quartet, 1996
 Shine!/Short Term Memory Loss - Kyuss, 1996
 Into The Void - Kyuss, 1996
 Kyuss/Queens of the Stone Age - Kyuss and Queens of the Stone Age, 1997
 Volumes 1 & 2 - Desert Sessions, 1997
 Volumes 3 & 4 - Desert Sessions, 1998
 Queens of the Stone Age - Queens of the Stone Age, 1998
 Sounds of Liberation - Ché, 2000
 Muchas Gracias: The Best of Kyuss - Kyuss, 2000
 Orquestra Del Desierto - Orquestra Del Desierto, 2002
 III The EP - Mondo Generator, 2004
 Person Non Grata - Vic du Monte's Persona Non Grata, 2005
 Rock Formations LP  - Yawning Man, 2005
 Pot Head EP - Yawning Man, 2005
 Live at W2 Den Bosch. Netherlands. (DVD) - Yawning Man, 2005
 Vista Point - Yawning Man, 2007
 Dead Planet - Mondo Generator, 2007
 Somera Sól - Brant Bjork and the Bros, 2007
 Sweet Sixteen (EP) - Vic du Monte's Persona Non Grata, 2007
 Re Dinamite (Split EP) - Vic du Monte's Persona Non Grata, 2009
 Autoblond - Vic du Monte's Persona Non Grata, 2009
 Barons & Bankers - Vic du Monte's Persona Non Grata, 2010
 Nomadic Pursuits - Yawning Man, 2010
 Split EP w/ Fatso Jetson - Yawning Man, 2013
 Fragments - Brave Black Sea, 2014

External links
 The Drummers of Stoner Rock
 Duna Records official website
 Orquesta del Desierto's official site
 Alone Records
 Yawning Man Myspace page
 Queens of the Stone Age's official website
 Gusto's official website

References 

American rock drummers
Living people
Year of birth missing (living people)
Queens of the Stone Age members
Kyuss members
Mondo Generator members